Gauthier Clémente (born 27 July 1998) is a French professional footballer who plays as a left winger.

References

1998 births
Living people
Sportspeople from Agen
French footballers
French expatriate footballers
Expatriate footballers in Greece
Aris Thessaloniki F.C. players
Olympiacos Volos F.C. players
Trikala F.C. players
Association football wingers
French expatriate sportspeople in Greece
Footballers from Nouvelle-Aquitaine